The Macintosh Classic is a personal computer designed, manufactured and sold by Apple Computer from October 1990 to September 1992. It was the first Macintosh to sell for less than US$1,000.

Production of the Classic was prompted by the success of the original Macintosh 128K, then the Macintosh Plus, and finally the Macintosh SE. The system specifications of the Classic are very similar to those of its predecessors, with the same  monochrome CRT display, 512 × 342pixel resolution, and 4megabyte (MB) memory limit of the older Macintosh computers. Apple's decision to not update the Classic with newer technology such as a newer CPU, higher RAM capacity or color display resulted in criticism from reviewers, with Macworld describing it as having "nothing to gloat about beyond its low price" and "unexceptional". However, it ensured compatibility with the Mac's by-then healthy software base, as well as enabled it to sell for the lower price, as planned. The Classic also featured several improvements over the aging Macintosh Plus, which it replaced as Apple's low-end Mac computer. It is up to 25percent faster than the Plus and included an Apple SuperDrive  floppy disk drive as standard. Unlike the Macintosh SE/30 and other compact Macs before it, the Classic did not have an internal Processor Direct Slot, making it the first non-expandable desktop Macintosh since the Macintosh Plus. Instead, it had a memory expansion/FPU slot.

The Classic is an adaptation of Jerry Manock's and Terry Oyama's 1984 Macintosh 128K industrial design, as had been the earlier Macintosh SE. Apple released two versions. The price and the availability of education software led to the Classic's popularity in education. It was sold alongside the more powerful Macintosh Classic II in 1991 until its discontinuation the next year.

History

Development
After Apple co-founder Steve Jobs left Apple in 1985, product development was handed to Jean-Louis Gassée, formerly the manager of Apple France. Gassée consistently pushed the Apple product line in two directions, towards more "openness" in terms of expandability and interoperability, and towards higher price. Gassée long argued that Apple should not aim for the low end of the computer market, where profits were thin, but instead concentrate on the high end and higher profit margins. He illustrated the concept using a graph showing the price/performance ratio of computers with low-power, low-cost machines in the lower left and high-power high-cost machines in the upper right. The "high-right" goal became a mantra among the upper management, who said "fifty-five or die", referring to Gassée's goal of a 55 percent profit margin.

The high-right policy led to a series of machines with ever-increasing prices. The original Macintosh plans called for a system around $1,000, but by the time it had morphed from Jef Raskin's original vision of an easy-to-use machine for composing text documents to Jobs' concept incorporating ideas gleaned during a trip to Xerox PARC, the Mac's list price had ballooned to $2,495.

With the "low-left" of the market it had abandoned years earlier booming with Turbo XTs, and being ignored on the high end for UNIX workstations from the likes of Sun Microsystems and SGI, Apple's fortunes of the 1980s quickly reversed. The Christmas season of 1989 drove this point home, with the first decrease in sales in years, and an accompanying 20 percent drop in Apple's stock price for the quarter.

In January 1990, Gassée resigned and his authority over product development was divided among several successors. Many Apple engineers had long been pressing for lower-cost options in order to build market share and increase demand across the entire price spectrum. With Gassée out, a rush started to quickly introduce a series of low-cost machines. Three market points were identified, a very low-cost machine aimed at costing $1,000, a low-cost machine with color graphics, and a more upscale color machine for small business use. In time, these would develop as the Classic, Macintosh LC, and Macintosh IIsi.

Release
MacWEEK magazine reported on July 10, 1990, that Apple had paid  to Modular Computer Systems Inc., a subsidiary of Daimler-Benz AG, for the right to use the "Classic" name as part of a five-year contract. Apple did not renew the contract when it ended.

We redesigned these computers from the ground up with the features customers have told us they value most." Apple's new pricing strategy caused concern among investors, who thought it would reduce profit margins. Brodie Keast, an Apple product marketing manager, said, "We are prepared to do whatever it takes to reach more people with Macintosh[...] The plan is to get as aggressive on price as we need to be."

The Classic was released in Europe and Japan concurrently with the United States release.

After spending  marketing the Classic to first-time buyers, Apple had difficulty meeting the high demand. Apple doubled its manufacturing space in 1990 by expanding its Singapore and Cork, Ireland factories, where the Classic was assembled. Air freight, rather than sea shipping, was used to speed delivery. The shortage caused concern among dealers, who blamed Apple's poor business planning.

Macintosh Classics and LCs had been given to Scholastic Software 12 weeks before they were officially announced, and Scholastic planned to release 16 new Macintosh products in 1991. Peter Kelman, Scholastic's publisher, predicted that the Macintosh would become "the school machine of the nineties." This, and the availability of educational software, led to the Classic's popularity in the education sector.

Features
The low-end model was sold with 1 MB of memory, a 1.44 MB floppy drive, no hard disk, and included a keyboard for $999. The $1,500 model used 2 MB of memory and a 40 MB hard disk. The Classic features several improvements over the Macintosh Plus, which it replaced as Apple's low-end Mac computer: it is up to 25 percent faster than the Plus, about as fast as the SE, and includes an Apple SuperDrive 3.5" floppy disk drive as standard. The SuperDrive can read and write to Macintosh, MS-DOS, OS/2, and ProDOS disks. The Classic also has an expansion slot that is only for memory (up to 10 MB) and/or a 68882 FPU.

The Classic uses the System 6.0.7 operating system with support for all versions up to System 7.5.5. A hidden Hierarchical File System (HFS) disk volume contained in the read-only memory (ROM) includes System 6.0.3. The Mac Classic can be booted into System 6.0.3 by holding down the  keys during boot.

Some dealers included a software bundle called Smartbundle with the Classic. Also sold separately for $349, this includes T/Maker's WriteNow word processor, Ashton-Tate's Full Impact spreadsheet program, RecordHolderPlus database, and Silicon Beach Software's SuperPaint 2.0 paint and draw program.

Design

The Macintosh Classic is the final adaptation of Jerry Manock's and Terry Oyama's Macintosh 128K industrial design, bringing back some elements of the original while retaining little of the Snow White design language used in the Macintosh SE's design. The only remnant of the SE is the stripe across the front panel (bezel) for the floppy drive; the distinctive front bezel lines of the SE were not used on the Classic, and the vertical lines around its base are replaced by four horizontal vent lines, more reminiscent of the original design. Also, the curve of the front bezel was increased to the same  radial curve as on the front of both the Macintosh LC and Macintosh IIsi. The screen brightness dial on this bezel was also removed in favor of a software control. This broad, curved front bezel became a signature of Apple product design for much of the 1990s.

The logic board, the central circuit board of the computer, is based on the Macintosh SE design. Its size, however, was reduced using surface mount technology to 9 × 5 inches (23 × 13 cm), half the size of the SE board. This redesign, and the absence of expansion slots, kept manufacturing costs low. This lack of expansion abilities, along with the small screen size and Macintosh's popularity in desktop publishing, led to such oddities as video displays that connected through the SCSI port by users seeking to connect a larger full- or dual-page display to their Mac. The Classic design was used once more in 1991 for the Classic II, which succeeded the Classic.

Reception
Some reviewers of the Macintosh Classic focused on the processor performance and lack of expansion slots. Liza Schafer of Home Office Computing praised the Classic's ease of use and price, but criticized the  display because a full US letter page would not fit at full size, and warned those who required high-end graphics and desktop publishing capabilities against buying the Classic. Schafer concluded: "The Classic's value is more impressive than its performance, but its performance will get you working on that novel, database, or spreadsheet." PC Week criticized the lack of a faster processor, stating, "The 7.8MHz speed is adequate for text applications and limited graphics work, but it is not suitable for power users. As such, the Classic is appropriate as a home computer or for limited computing on the road." Similarly, PC User'''s review concluded, "The slow processor and lack of expansion slots on the Macintosh Classic offset the low prices". MacWEEK described it as a "fine, inexpensive replacement for the Macintosh Plus that best embodies the original Macintosh vision six and a half years later". Computer Gaming World was more skeptical, doubting that consumers would purchase a black-and-white computer with no hard drive that was only slightly faster than the Mac Plus.

In the February 1991 edition of Electronic Learning'', Robert McCarthy wrote: "Teachers, educational administrators, and software developers are enthusiastic about the new, lower-cost Apple Macintosh computers". Steve Taffe, manager of instructional strategy at MECC, a developer and publisher of educational software, explained his excitement about the Classic: "[it] is terrific – both because it's a Mac and because of that low price. Everyone can now afford a Macintosh." Scholastic, an educational software developer, was also confident of Apple's ability to compete with MS-DOS machines, stating: "They are just as cost-effective and as powerful as MS-DOS computers, but the Apples will have a superior comfort level." Sue Talley, Apple's manager of strategic planning in education, said of the Classic: "we see it going into applications where you need a fair number of powerful stations, but where color is not a big issue." Talley mentioned that it was most suited for writing labs and other basic productivity uses. Many schools decided not to buy the Macintosh Classic because of the lack of a color monitor, an option that the higher-priced Macintosh LC had. The popular Apple IIe Card also increased the LC's appeal to schools. Although the Classic was more popular at first, by May 1992 the LC (560,000 sold) was outselling the Classic (1.2 million sold).

Specifications

Timeline

See also
 Basilisk II, emulator with limited support
 Mini vMac, emulator capable of booting from the ROM disk
 List of Macintosh models grouped by CPU type

References

External links

 Mac Classic profile lowendmac.com

Classic
Classic
Computer-related introductions in 1990
Products and services discontinued in 1992